is a Rinzai Zen Buddhist temple located in northern area of the city of Tajimi, Gifu Prefecture, Japan. Founded in the Kamakura period, two of the structures of the temple are designated National Treasures of Japan and its gardens are a nationally designated Place of Scenic Beauty.

History
Eihō-ji was established in 1313 by the Nanzen-ji branch of Rinzai Zen Buddhism. On September 10, 2003, one of the main living quarters was destroyed by a fire. After a fundraising campaign run by the residents of Tajimi, the restoration was completed on August 29, 2007.

The temple grounds are home to a number of zazen trainees, and the temple holds regular zazen sessions open to the general public. In addition to two buildings listed as National Treasures of Japan, the grounds include a pond, bridge and waterfall, and a traditional Zen garden.

See also 

 Glossary of Japanese Buddhism.

References

External links
 Kokeizan Eiho-ji official web site (Japanese version)

National Treasures of Japan
Buddhist temples in Gifu Prefecture
Nanzen-ji temples
1310s establishments in Japan
1313 establishments in Asia
Tajimi, Gifu